Marian de Forest (February 27, 1864 – February 17, 1935) was an American journalist, playwright, major force in the progressive women's movement, and founder of Zonta (later Zonta International), a service organization of women professionals. She was inducted into the National Women's Hall of Fame in 2001.

Biography
She graduated from Buffalo Seminary in 1884. Thereafter, she became one of the first female reporters in Western New York State and wrote for The Buffalo Evening News and then with The Buffalo Commercial.

As a leading playwright, she supported women's role in the theater. De Forest also co-founded the Buffalo Musical Foundation, thereby bringing the American Opera Company to Western New York. She also played a prominent role in the formation of the Buffalo Philharmonic Orchestra.

In 1919, she founded Zonta, "a service organization of executive women working to improve the legal, political, economic and professional status of women worldwide." Zonta is a Lakota Sioux Indian word that means "honest and trustworthy." In one of her early speeches, de Forest explained, "Zonta stands for the highest standards in the business and professional world ... seeks cooperation rather than competition and considers the Golden Rule not only good ethics but good business". De Forest envisioned Zonta to become an international organization. In her own words, "This is the woman's age and in distant lands and foreign climes women of all nations are rallying to the call … Zonta is given the opportunity of uniting them into one great, glorious whole."

De Forest's drama papers are in the collection of the Buffalo History Museum.

References

External links
 Marian De Forest's adaptation of "Little Women"
 Marian De Forest Papers, 1910-1961, bulk 1910-1935: An inventory at EmpireADC.org courtesy of the Buffalo History Museum.

1864 births
1935 deaths
American dramatists and playwrights
Writers from Buffalo, New York
American women dramatists and playwrights
American women journalists
Journalists from New York (state)
Buffalo Seminary alumni